Maria Basina Kloos FBMVA (also known as Sister Basina: born February 1940) is a German nun.   She has served several terms as Superior general of the Waldbreitbacher Franciscan sisters between 1988 and 1994, and again between 2000 and 2012.

Biography
Dorothea Kloos (as she was originally known) was born in Bad Gams, a small market town approximately 18 miles / 30 km from Graz in Austria.   Slightly unusually, the family into which she was born was half Catholic and half Protestant.  She grew up in Idar-Oberstein, a town in the hills north of Saarbrücken.  Her earlier career ambitions had been a little esoteric.   She planned to become a criminologist and sat the necessary exam to embark on the training,   Then she determined to become a teacher.   She was still only 17 when, in 1957, she entered the Waldbreitbacher Franciscan community, taking the monastic name Basina.   Her management skills seem to have been spotted early on:  she was still only 23 when she took charge of the commercial and administrative functions at one of the order's hospitals.   Between 1976 and 1988 she served as vicar general of the order.   Then, in 1988, she was appointed Superior general, serving till 1994.   She served as general secreatary to the German Association of Religious Order Heads ("Vereinigung der Ordensoberinnen Deutschlands" /VOD)) between 1995 and 1998.  She served a further term as Superior general from 2000 till 2012.

In August 2012 Basina  Kloos took over as co-head ("Geschäftsführerin") of the Trier-based Marienhaus Gesundheits- und Sozialholding GmbH company, one of the largest Christian social welfare businesses in Germany.  She stepped down from the post in 2015, a few months after her 75th birthday.

Awards and honours (selection)

References 

People from Rhineland-Palatinate
Nuns of the Franciscan Third Order Regular
Superiors general
Officers Crosses of the Order of Merit of the Federal Republic of Germany
Recipients of the Saarland Order of Merit
1940 births
Living people
20th-century German Roman Catholic nuns
21st-century German Roman Catholic nuns